Sam Hewson (born 28 November 1988) is an English footballer who plays as a centre midfielder for 2. deild karla side Þróttur Reykjavík.

Club career

Early career
Born in Farnworth, near Bolton, Hewson began his career at his local club, AFC Bolton, at the age of eight. He played two matches for the team before being spotted by Manchester United's youth scouts. He was then offered a place in the Manchester United Academy a year later, and started training with the club before he had even reached ten years of age.

Hewson started playing for the Manchester United under-17 team during the 2003–04 season, and scored in his second game. The following season, he only played one game for the under-18 side, in which he was substituted by Jamie Mullan. He signed a trainee contract with United in the summer of 2005, and became a regular in the under-18 team during the following season, playing in 28 matches including four in the FA Youth Cup. He also made his debut for the reserves on 26 September 2005, coming on as a substitute for Markus Neumayr against Newcastle United.

In 2006–07, Hewson was named as the captain of the Manchester United under-18 side, and made 26 appearances for the team, including eight appearances in the FA Youth Cup, his five goals helping United to the final, where they lost to Liverpool. The following season, he signed his first professional contract and became a regular in the reserve team, playing in 22 matches in all competitions. After being handed a first team squad number (43), he also received his first taste of first team action on 12 December 2007, when he was named as an unused substitute for United's final Champions League group stage match away to Roma. He also helped the reserve team to the finals of both the Manchester Senior Cup and the Lancashire Senior Cup, beating Bolton Wanderers in the former and Liverpool in the latter.

Despite being given a new first team squad number (33), he continued in the reserve team in 2008–09, and was ever-present in the side until January 2009, when he went on loan to Hereford United for three months. He made his Hereford debut in a 5–0 home win over Oldham Athletic on 17 January 2009, but was substituted in the 79th minute. He scored his first goal for Hereford in a 4–1 defeat to Stockport County. In the next game, he scored twice as Hereford beat Cheltenham 3–2. Hewson made a total of 10 appearances for Hereford before returning to Manchester United at the end of the season.

In February 2010, Hewson joined Bury on loan until the end of the 2009–10 season. Hewson returned to Manchester United at the end of the season, but his contract was not renewed and he was allowed to leave the club on a free transfer. In August 2010, he was given a trial by Grimsby Town and played in a reserves match against Lincoln City on 25 August.

Altrincham
He signed for Conference National club Altrincham in September 2010. Having made 19 Conference appearances for Altrincham, Hewson was released in March 2011.

Iceland
In August 2011, Hewson joined Icelandic club Fram. After two-and-a-half seasons he joined FH where he won two Úrvalsdeild titles. In 2017 he moved to Grindavík.

On 11 October 2018, after two seasons with Grindavík, Hewson moved on to fellow top-flight Icelandic side Fylkir.

On 15 November 2020, Hewson agreed to join 1. deild karla side Þróttur Reykjavík as a player/coach, signing a four-year deal.

International career
In February 2007, Hewson made his debut for the England U19 squad for the friendly against Poland's U19 side. He has since made further appearances for the England U19 team, playing against Turkey and Austria, as well as playing in the 2007 UEFA European Under-19 Football Championship Elite Qualifying Group against Russia and the Czech Republic.

Honours

Club
Fram
Icelandic Cup winner: 2013

FH
Icelandic League Cup winner: 2014
Úrvalsdeild winner: 2015, 2016
Icelandic Super Cup winner: 2016

References

External links

1988 births
Living people
People from Farnworth
English footballers
England youth international footballers
Association football midfielders
Manchester United F.C. players
Hereford United F.C. players
Bury F.C. players
Altrincham F.C. players
Knattspyrnufélagið Fram players
Fimleikafélag Hafnarfjarðar players
Grindavík men's football players
Fylkir players
Knattspyrnufélagið Þróttur players
English Football League players
National League (English football) players
2. deild karla players
Expatriate footballers in Iceland
English expatriate footballers
English expatriate sportspeople in Iceland